The Journal of Social History was founded in 1967 and has been edited since then by Peter Stearns. The journal covers social history in all regions and time periods.

Articles in the journal frequently combine sociohistorical analysis between Latin America, Africa, Asia, Russia, Western Europe, and the United States. The journal is published quarterly by the George Mason University Press. Since the September 2011 issue, it has also been published by Oxford University Press.

References

External links
 

Publications established in 1967
English-language journals
Social history journals
Quarterly journals
George Mason University academic journals
Oxford University Press academic journals